The Sultan of Banten was the ruler of Banten Sultanate in the province of Banten, Indonesia, which had triumphed at the western tip of Java island. The sultanate was founded by Maulana Hasanuddin of Banten who reigned between 1552 to 1570. It was one of the most important Muslim dynasties in pre-colonial Indonesia that made contact with the Europeans.

List of Sultans of Banten 

 Syarif Hidayatullah or Sunan Gunung Jati from Sultanate of Cirebon
 Sultan Maulana Hasanuddin or Prince Sabakinking 1552–1570
 Sultan Maulana Yusuf or Prince Pasareyan 1570–1585
 Sultan Maulana Muhammad or Prince Sedangrana 1585–1596
 Sultan Abu al-Mafakhir Mahmud Abdulkadir or Pangeran Ratu 1596–1647
 Sultan Abu al-Ma'ali Ahmad 1647–1651
 Sultan Abu al-Fath Abdul Fattah or Sultan Ageng Tirtayasa 1651–1683
 Sultan Abu Nashar Abdul Qahar or Sultan Haji 1683–1687
 Sultan Abu Fadhl Muhammad Yahya 1687–1690
 Sultan Abu al-Mahasin Muhammad Zainul Abidin 1690–1733
 Sultan Abu al-Fathi Muhammad Syifa Zainul Arifin 1733–1750
 Sultan Syarifuddin Ratu Wakil, in effect Ratu Syarifah Fatimah 1750–1752
 Sultan Abu al-Ma'ali Muhammad Wasi Zainal Alimin or Pangeran Arya Adisantika 1752–1753
 Sultan Arif Zainul Asyiqin al-Qadiri 1753–1773
 Sultan Abu al-Mafakhir Muhammad Aliuddin 1773–1799
 Sultan Abu al-Fath Muhammad Muhyiddin Zainussalihin 1799–1801
 Sultan Abu al-Nashar Muhammad Ishaq Zainulmutaqin 1801–1802
 Caretaker Sultan Wakil Pangeran Natawijaya 1802–1803
 Sultan Abu al-Mafakhir Muhammad Aliyuddin II 1803–1808
 Caretaker Sultan Wakil Pangeran Suramenggala 1808–1809
 Sultan Muhammad ibn Muhammad Muhyiddin Zainussalihin 1809–1813
 Sultan Syarif Muhammad ash-Shafiuddin or Ratu Bagus Hendra Bambang Wisanggeni Soerjaatmadja 2016–current

Family tree

References

External links 
 Banten Sultanate 

Banten